Alfred Davenport was a rugby union international who represented England in 1871.

Early life
Alfred Davenport was born on May 5,1849 in Oxford. He attended Rugby School and went to the University of Oxford.

Rugby union career
Davenport represented and captained the Oxford University rugby side. He made his international debut on March 27,1871 at Edinburgh in the Scotland vs England match that also proved to be the first ever international rugby match.

References

1849 births
1932 deaths
English rugby union players
England international rugby union players
Rugby union forwards
People educated at Rugby School
Rugby union players from Oxford